Cachuma Lake is a reservoir in the Santa Ynez Valley of central Santa Barbara County, California on the Santa Ynez River adjoining the north side of California State Route 154. The artificial lake was created by the construction of Bradbury Dam, a  earth-fill structure built by the U.S. Bureau of Reclamation in 1953.
The late-December, 2022 and early-January, 2023, storms dramatically raised the water level in the lake, from an average of 33% full to 100% full for the first time in 12 years.

History 
Built by the U.S. Bureau of Reclamation in 1953, the name "Cachuma" comes from a Chumash village that the Spanish spelled "Aquitsumu", from the Barbareño Chumash word aqitsu'm, meaning "sign".

The U.S. Bureau of Reclamation oversees the lake’s operations and maintenance. Five agencies that stretch from Santa Ynez to Carpinteria take water from Cachuma. The Central Coast Water Authority (CCWA) extension of the California Aqueduct completed in 1997, is a  that travels  from Vandenberg Space Force Base through Vandenberg Village, Lompoc, Buellton, and Solvang and terminates at Cachuma.

Water Levels 
The water levels of the lake are highly variable, spilling in some years and receding to less than 10% of capacity in dry years. Drought conditions can cause shortage in water supplies, as did the 2011-17 drought.

In October 2016, the lake approached low levels not seen since the construction of Bradbury Dam. At this time, the storage volume was only , approximately 7.3% of capacity.

In January and February 2017, a series of frequent rains raised the water level substantially. On one day, February 17, 2017, the lake rose by  during the storm alone, followed by further increases from storm runoff. The Lake's water level declined again during the 2017-18 water year, with the Lake receding to less than one-third of its capacity. By March 28, 2019, above-normal precipitation had restored Lake Cachuma to 78.0% of its capacity.

Despite an abnormally dry January and February 2020, a wet March and April brought the lake to 77% of capacity as of April 7, 2020.

Several consecutive atmospheric river storms coming in from the Pacific in late-December, 2022 and early-January, 2023 dramatically raised the water level in the lake, from an average of 33% full in late December, to nearly 100% full by January 15, 2023 for the first time in 12 years. Further storms in February resulted in flood warnings for portions of Lompoc close to the river due to the water being released from the dam.

Recreation
Santa Barbara County Parks offers cabin and yurt rentals, as well as RV, tent, and group camping. Gasoline and groceries are available at the general store. There is a full boat and kayak rental facility with a bait and tackle shop where fishing licenses can be purchased. The lake is stocked with rainbow trout throughout the winter season, and fishing is open all year from shore or boat. There are five miles of hiking trails within the park, and Los Padres National Forest trails close by.

A large campsite on the south shore of Cachuma Lake is administered by the Santa Barbara County Park's division of the Community Services Department.

The University of California, Santa Barbara rowing team regularly practices and races at Cachuma Lake and erected a permanent boathouse there just prior to the 1982-1983 school year. The lake is also a popular destination for viewing bald eagles from seasonal tour boats.

Body contact activities such as swimming, wading, or water skiing in Cachuma Lake have been restricted since the park opened in the 1950s, reasoning that the lake was a reservoir people depend upon for drinking water. In May 2011, the no body contact regulation was revised to allow human-powered recreational watercraft such as kayaks and canoes on the lake as well as allow dogs on boats and eliminate "incidental body contact" with the water as a punishable offense.

Natural history activities and programs

Santa Barbara County Parks offers a variety of natural programs including wildlife lake cruises, nature walks, junior ranger programs, campfire programs on summer weekends, and a family-oriented live animal event in the fall. School and community group environmental education field trips are available all year.

Neal Taylor Nature Center 
Located in Santa Barbara, the Neal Taylor Nature Center, formerly the Cachuma Lake Nature Center, features exhibits and hands-on displays about the area's cultural and natural history, including local plants, animals, birds and geology. The nature center is open year-round and admission is free. The center offers youth and adult workshops and lectures as well as school and youth nature education programs in partnership with the Santa Barbara County Parks natural history programs.

See also
List of dams and reservoirs in California
List of lakes in California
List of largest reservoirs of California

References

External links 

 
 Cachuma Lake Website - official site
 Neal Taylor Nature Center - Neal Taylor Nature Center at Cachuma Lake 
 County Parks Website - County of Santa Barbara

Cachuma, Lake
Nature centers in California
Cachuma, Lake
Cachuma